The Bavarian ice hockey leagues are part of the German ice hockey league system and form the tiers four to six of the league system in the state of Bavaria. The leagues are operated by the Bayrischer Eissport Verband, the Bavarian association for ice sports.

Overview

The league system in Bavaria consists of three separate tiers, these being the Bayernliga (IV) (English:Bavarian League), Landesliga (V) (English:State League) and Bezirksliga (VI) (English:County League). The overall system has remained unchanged for a lengthy period of seasons.

The number of clubs, especially in the lowest tier, the Bezirksliga, can fluctuate due to teams joining and other teams leaving the league. This is mostly due to lack of players, or, the other extreme, an over supply of players and the need to form a reserves team. Occasionally, clubs fold, reform or re-enter the league system. In the current Bayernliga season, the EC 2000 Ulm/Neu-Ulm folded in December 2007, being unable to pay their players.

The Bayernliga champion earns the right to gain promotion to the Oberliga. At the end of the 2006-07 season, the runner-up was also promoted, which is an exception.

Until the end of the 1999-2000 season, the Bayernliga was only the fifth tier of the league system. The league between Oberliga and Bayernliga, the Regionalliga, was disbanded after this season and the majority of its clubs integrated into the Oberliga.

The Bavarian Eissport Verband (BEV) is the largest regional ice hockey association in Germany with 14.000 registered players in over 90 clubs. Apart from the 79 senior teams playing in its league system for the 2007-08 season, there is also eight women's teams and 284 junior teams.  For this reason, the Bayernliga is the only statewide league whose champion directly qualifies for the Oberliga, all other leagues, the Regionalligas (English:Regional Leagues) cover larger areas or have to go through a promotion play-off round.

Above the BEV there are currently five Bavarian teams in the DEL (German Ice Hockey League) (I), two in the 2nd Bundesliga (II) and twelve in the Oberliga (III).  This means, 19 of 56 clubs in the first three divisions of German ice hockey currently come from Bavaria.

Ice hockey in Bavaria
Bavaria, especially the southern, mountainous region of it, is the "cradle" of German ice hockey with many former German internationals coming from there. Historically, the German championship was dominated by clubs from Bavaria and Berlin. Nowadays however, Bavarian teams rarely win a championship. The situation is actually very similar to the Canadian teams in the NHL, who provide the majority of players but win a minority of titles.

In 87 editions of the German championship until 2007, Bavarian clubs have won 35. Of the current DEL teams, none hold a German title to their name. In the 2nd Bundesliga, Landshut and Riessersee hold 12 titles between them and in the Oberliga, Füssen, Tölz and Rosenheim have earned 20 German championship between them. The EV Füssen is second only in numbers of titles to Berliner Schlittschuhclub, having won 16 German championships from 1949 to 1973.

One reason for the leading role Bavarian ice hockey had, and still to some extent has, is the number of ice hockey stadiums in the state. Almost 40 percent of all stadiums in Germany are in Bavaria and twice as many as in the second-ranked state Nordrhein-Westfalen:

Source:

Leagues & modus
The nine senior leagues split over three tiers, operating on the following modus:

Bayernliga
For the 2007-08 season, the Bayernliga sponsored the Bayer company operated in one single division of 16 clubs. The season went from October 2007 to March 2008.

Each team in the league played each other twice, home and away. at the end of the regular season, the top eight teams entered a play-off round. In a best-of-three modus, the winner of the Bayernliga was determined. The bottom eight teams also played a best-of-three play-down round to determine the two teams relegated to the Landesligas.

Until the end of the 1999-2000 season, the league operated on a fourteen club home-and-away season with no play-offs. From 2000, the strength of the league was increased to sixteen clubs in two regional groups of eight. After a first round, the top four of each group played another group stage, the championship group. The bottom four from each group did the same in a relegation group. From the 2002-03 season, play-offs were introduced after the championship round. The year after, the league moved to its current modus of a sixteen team home-and-away season with play-offs at the end.

Landesliga
Each of the four Landesligas played a regular season of home-and-away matches. The two first placed teams of each league then entered a championship round of eight teams. Again played in home-and-away modus, the top two teams of this round gain promotion to the Bayernliga. Should one or more teams from the Bayernliga gain entry to the Oberliga with a lesser number then that being relegated from the Oberliga to the Bayernliga, additional teams may be promoted from the Landesliga.

The other six teams in each of the four Landesligas played out another home-and-away round with the last placed team from each league being relegated to the corresponding Bezirksliga.

This modus for the 2007-08 season actually differs from the previous years, when after the first round of home-and-away games, the Landesligas were split into a top-four and a bottom-four group, with the latter determining the relegated team and the former playing for the group champion who would enter a four-team play-off for the Landesliga title and Bayernliga promotion.

Bezirksliga
In the Bezirksliga, the lowest level of play, each league again plays a home-and-away season. The winner of each Bezirksliga goes to the Bezirksliga championship where the four teams determined the champion of this level. Each of the four regional champions is also promoted to the corresponding Landesliga. For all other clubs in the Bezirksliga the season ends after the main round. there is no relegation as there is no league below the Bezirksliga.

Bayernliga, Landesliga and Bezirksliga champions
On top of the division champions, each tier also plays out its level champions, the Bayernliga Meister, Landesliga Meister and Bezirksliga Meister.

Bayernliga

 With the ETC Crimmitschau in 1992, a team from Sachsen won the Bayernliga.

Landesliga

Bezirksliga

 The 2000-01 Bezirksliga final saw the clash of two Bavarian "giants". The two re-formed clubs, SB Rosenheim and EV Landsberg both didn't lose a regular season game and remained unbeaten in the semi-finals, Landsberg having scored 234 goals in 14 matches and Rosenheim 164 in 12. Landsberg then went on to win both final games finishing on a 16-0-0 record with 247 goals for and 15 goals against. A year later, the situation repeated itself quite similar in the Landesliga, with the EVL again dominating.

Divisionial champions
The Landsliga and Bezirksliga are subdivided in four divisions each with the following divisional champions:

Landesliga

Bezirksliga

League system in the 2008-09 season

Source: 

Placings in the Bayernliga 2000 to 2009

 The club Eishockeyclub HC 98 München was renamed in 2003 into EHC München.
 The SB Rosenheim as company were withdrew from the DEL  in 2000 and the club Sportbund Rosenheim folded its ice sports department also in 2000. The newfounded club Starbulls Rosenheim had to restart in the Bezirksliga The EV Landsberg folded in 2000. The newfounded club EV Landsberg 2000 had to restart in the Bezirksliga and was renamed 2010 into EV Landsberg.
 The Deggendorfer EC folded in 2002. The teams of Deggendorfer EC changed to the other club Deggendorfer SC The Peissenberg Hornets as company were withdrew in 2001. The club TSV Peißenberg forwards the playing-mode of the Senior team, which had to restart in the Bezirksliga.
 The Erding Jets folded as company in 2002. The club TSV Erding restarted the playing-mode of the Senior team in 2002 in the Bezirksliga.
 The EC Atlantis Ulm folded in 2003. The 2000 founded club EC Ulm 2000 folded in late 2007. The newfounded club VfE Ulm/Neu-Ulm started the playing-mode in 2007/08.
 The EHC Memmingen folded in 2003. The teams of EHC Memmingen changed to the other club ECDC Memmingen.
 The ERC Selb folded in 2004. The newfounded club VER Selb  had to restart in the Bezirksliga.
 The Augsburger EV withdrew its team in 2005 and restart the playing-mode in 2010.
 The Mighty Dogs Schweinfurt as company were withdrew in 2005. The playing-mode were forwarded by the amateur team of ERV Schweinfurt in the Landesliga.
 The Geretsried River Rats as company were withdrew in 2003. The member of the ice sports department goes out of the club TuS Geretsried in 2006 and the newfounded club ESC Riverrats Geretsried had to restart in the Bezirksliga.
 The Eisbären Regensburg as company folded in 2008. The playing-mode were forward by the amateur team of EV Regensburg in the Landesliga.
 The club SV Gendorf was renamed after 2000 in SVG Burgkirchen and stopped the playing-mode of the Senior team in 2010 after losing the Possibility to Play in Burgkirchen at the River Alz.

Bavarian clubs in the German league system
For the 2016-17 season, the following clubs from Bavaria played in the top three German leagues:

In the DEL:
 Thomas Sabo (Nürnberg) Ice Tigers
 Augsburger Panther
 Straubing Tigers
 Ingolstadt Panther
 EHC München

In the 2nd Bundesliga:
 Starbulls Rosenheim
 SC Riessersee

In the Oberliga:
 EC Bad Tölz
 EC Peiting
 ERC Sonthofen
 EV Landshut
 EHC Waldkraiburg
 EV Lindau
 EV Regensburg
 VER Selb
 Deggendorfer SC
 1. EV Weiden
 EHV Schönheide
 Höchstädter EC

External links 
 Bayernhockey-Inoffical website on Bavarian ice hockey
 Eishockey Magazin (in German)
 Hockeyweb-Tables and results from the regional German associations

See also
 Deutsche Eishockey Liga, the DEL
 2nd Bundesliga
 Oberliga

League seasons 
 2006-07 Bavarian ice hockey season
 2007-08 Bavarian ice hockey season

Sources 
 Bayrischer Eissport Verband- Official Bavarian ice hockey website
 Hockey Archives - International ice hockey website with tables and results (in French)
 Private website on the history of Munich ice hockey

References 

Ice hockey leagues in Germany
leagues